IEEE Transactions on Network Science and Engineering is a quarterly peer-reviewed scientific journal published by the IEEE Communications Society. It covers the theory and applications of network science and networked systems. The editor-in-chief is Jianwei Huang (The Chinese University of Hong Kong, Shenzhen).

It is one of the highest quality and most selective journals in the field of network science. According to the Journal Citation Reports, the journal has a 2020 impact factor of 3.894.

References

External links

Engineering journals
IEEE academic journals